We Are Acid Mothers Afrirampo! is an album by members of Afrirampo and Acid Mothers Temple, under the band name Acid Mothers Afrirampo.

History

Plans for an Afrirampo and Acid Mothers Temple collaboration began in the spring of 2004, but instead Oni and Pikachu left Japan to study music in Africa.

Track list

Personnel

Acid Mothers Afrirampo consists of Afrirampo members Oni and Pikachu and Acid Mothers Temple leader Kawabata Makoto and members Tsuyama Atsushi and Higashi Hiroshi.

 Oni - voice, electric guitar, degital guitar, soprano recorder, drums
 Pikachu - voice, drums, percussion, toys, balloon
 Tsuyama Atsushi - voice, bass, drums, degital guitar, acoustic guitar, soprano recorder, kantele
 Higashi Hiroshi - electronics
 Kawabata Makoto - electric guitar, violin, hurdygurdy, glockenspiel, percussion, electronics, voice

Technical personnel

 Kawabata Makoto - production, mixing and engineering
 K. Hara - engineering
 Yoshida Tatsuya - digital mastering
 Kawabata Sachiko - artwork
 Hayasaka Tomohiro - live photography

References

External links 
 www.acidmothers.com
 www.afrirampo.com

2005 albums
Afrirampo albums
Acid Mothers Temple albums